Pingali may refer to:

Pingali Venkayya (died 1963), an Indian freedom fighter
Pingali Nagendrarao (1901–1971), a Telugu scriptwriter, playwright and lyricist
Pingali Suranna (fl. 16th century), a Telugu poet
Pingali Lakshmikantamu (1894–1972), an Indian poet and writer
Pingali, Parbhani, a village in Maharashtra state of India

Surnames of Indian origin